Sárbogárd is a town in Fejér county, Hungary. The town is at the intersection of important railroad routes in Hungary: this is where electrified routes from Balaton and Pécs merge with non-electrifed railways from Baja and Szekszárd. A double electrified track runs from Sárbogárd to Budapest allowing MÁV trains to provide quick access to the capital.

Twin towns — sister cities
Sárbogárd is twinned with:
 Bene, Ukraine
 Zetea, Romania

Notable people
Zoltán Lengyel (1960–), politician
Géza Mészöly (1844–1887), Romantic painter
Lajos Májer (1956–1998), footballer
Béla Jurcsek (1893–1945), politician, Minister of Agriculture
Gábor Varga (1968–), politician

Gallery

References

External links

 in Hungarian

Populated places in Fejér County